The Student Publication Association (SPA) is a national body for student newspapers and magazines in the United Kingdom and the Republic of Ireland. The SPA aims to provide support and training for student journalists, encourage best practice, and recognise success.

It is a non-profit body run by a team of volunteers, with five elected committee members, eight appointed regional officers, and up to seven trustees. Currently it has more than 150 member publications across the two countries.

The association was formed in 2012 and holds an annual national conference and awards ceremony for student journalists, as well as other various initiatives throughout the year.

In 2020, the SPA was entered onto the register of charities as a Charitable Incorporated Organisation.

Governing Structure 
The organisation is made up of five elected committee members, who are usually students or recent graduates. The team for 2021/22 is as follows:

 Chair: Ruby Punt
 Training & Opportunities Officer: Bethany Dawson
 Communications Officer: Marino Unger-Verna
 Conference & Events Officer: Ruby Punt
 Sponsorship Officer: Shannon McDonagh

The executive committee is supported by a team of regional officers and overseen by a trustee board of established journalists, some of which are elected and some appointed. The trustee board is currently made up of the following:

 Aubrey Allegretti
 Jem Collins
 Sally Patterson
 Geri Scott
 Chris Chohan
 Richard Brooks
 Juliet Rix

National Awards 
The Student Publication Association runs a national awards scheme for students in the UK and Republic of Ireland, which been in place since 2013. Since the closure of the Guardian Student Media Awards in 2016 the awards have become the only full set of journalism awards for students in the UK. They are judged by professional journalists across the industry.

#SPANC 
In addition to a number of smaller regional conferences, the organisation holds an annual national conference during the Easter holidays. The conference is held across three days at a UK university, and features talks and workshops from professional journalists, as well as the annual SPA Awards presentation evening. Currently, the conference has been held in:

 Southampton (2013) 
 Nottingham Trent (2014)
 Southampton (2015)
 Loughborough (2016)
 Leeds (2017)
 Cardiff (2018)
 York (2019)

See also
Canadian University Press
Associated Collegiate Press

References

External links

Student Publication Association page at Facebook

British companies established in 2013
Student organisations in the United Kingdom
News agencies based in the United Kingdom